Jemiah Jefferson (born 1972) is an American author of contemporary horror and erotic literature. Jefferson resides in Portland, Oregon.

Works
Jemiah Jefferson's first printed work was St*rf*ck*ng, a collection of short erotic stories published by Future Tense Books. Her first full-length novel was written in 24 hours in 1990. This became Voice of the Blood, published by Leisure Books in 2001 and then as an e-book in 2011. This was also Jefferson's first published work detailing the adventures of the vampire Daniel Blum.

Jefferson has written a series of novels, the second of which, Wounds, was released in May 2002. The third novel, Fiend, was released in April 2005, and in 2007 Jefferson published A Drop of Scarlet.  In 2010, Underland Press also published Jefferson's  wovel FirstWorld. In September 2011, Mixtape for the Apocalypse was released as an e-book.

Jefferson has also written for Willamette Week, a free weekly paper in Portland, the GLBT publication Just Out, as well as Plazm, 2Gyrlz Quarterly, and Cafe 80s Magazine.

Education and career
Jefferson graduated from Reed College in 1994.
Jefferson currently works in the editorial department at Dark Horse Comics and is a regular contributor to Popshifter.com.

References

External links

Interviews

 "A Heartbreaking Work of Staggering Evil", Village Voice, 2002
 Jemiah Jefferson: Implants, Vampires, and Fun", Idea Lab, 2010
 "Heidi's Pick Six: Jemiah Jefferson", 2011

1972 births
Living people
American horror writers
20th-century American novelists
21st-century American novelists
Writers from Denver
Writers from Portland, Oregon
Reed College alumni
African-American novelists
Women science fiction and fantasy writers
Women horror writers
American women short story writers
20th-century American women writers
21st-century American women writers
American women novelists
20th-century American short story writers
21st-century American short story writers
Novelists from Colorado
Novelists from Oregon
20th-century African-American women writers
20th-century African-American writers
21st-century African-American women writers
21st-century African-American writers
African-American history of Oregon